David Greer may refer to:

 David H. Greer (1844–1919), American Episcopal bishop